Tiago André Araújo Rodrigues (born 18 January 1997) simply Tiago André, is a Portuguese professional footballer who plays for Trofense as a left back.

Football career
On 20 January 2016, Tiago André made his professional debut with Rio Ave in a 2015–16 Taça da Liga match against Belenenses.

On 10 September 2019, André joined LigaPro club Leixões.

References

External links

Stats and profile at LPFP 

1997 births
Living people
People from Vila do Conde
Portuguese footballers
Association football defenders
Rio Ave F.C. players
Casa Pia A.C. players
Leixões S.C. players
C.D. Trofense players
Liga Portugal 2 players
Sportspeople from Porto District